The Dry Salvages may refer to:

the Dry Salvages (Massachusetts), a group of rocks off Rockport, Massachusetts
The Dry Salvages, a poem by T. S. Eliot about the Massachusetts island
The Dry Salvages (novella), a novella by Caitlín R. Kiernan, whose title refers to the poem